Jason Charles Staurovsky (born March 23, 1963 in Tulsa, Oklahoma) is a former American football placekicker from 1987 to 1992. He attended Bishop Kelley High School and the University of Tulsa, for whom he is the all-time leading scorer. He played for the St Louis Cardinals in 1987, the New England Patriots from 1988 to 1991, and the New York Jets in 1992. He currently resides in Tulsa, where he coaches youth athletics.

References

1963 births
Living people
Sportspeople from Tulsa, Oklahoma
American football placekickers
Tulsa Golden Hurricane football players
St. Louis Cardinals (football) players
New England Patriots players
New York Jets players
Players of American football from Oklahoma
National Football League replacement players